The comarca of the Campiña de Jerez (the Jerez countryside) is a comarca (county,  but with no administrative role) in the province of Cádiz, southern Spain.

The Campiña de Jerez comarca consists of the  municipalities of Jerez de la Frontera and San José del Valle.

External links
Asociación para el Desarrollo Rural de la Campiña de Jerez

Comarcas of the Province of Cádiz
Jerez de la Frontera